The  is a subway line in Tokyo, Japan, owned and operated by Tokyo Metro. The line was named after the Hibiya area in Chiyoda's Yurakucho district, under which it passes. On maps, diagrams and signboards, the line is shown using the color silver, and its stations are given numbers using the letter "H".

Overview

The line's path is somewhat similar to that of the Ginza Line; however, the Hibiya Line was designed to serve a number of important districts, such as Ebisu, Roppongi, Tsukiji, Kayabachō and Senju, which were not on an existing line.

The Hibiya Line became the first line operated by Tokyo Metro to offer through services with a private railway, and the second Tokyo subway line overall after the Toei Asakusa Line. Despite its name, the through service does not stop anywhere near the Tokyo Skytree.

The line is the first subway line overall to use  narrow gauge (as previous lines used standard gauge), and all subsequent lines operated by Tokyo Metro were built to this gauge to accommodate through services. (Of all subway lines built since the Hibiya Line, only the Shinjuku and Ōedo Lines were not built to this gauge.)

According to the Tokyo Metropolitan Bureau of Transportation, as of June 2009 the Hibiya Line is the eighth most crowded subway line in Tokyo, running at 164% capacity between Minowa and Iriya stations.

On maps, diagrams and signboards, the line is shown using the color silver, and its stations are numbered with the prefix "H".

As the old trains which have mixture of three and five doors per car have been retired, platform gates are now being installed as of 14 April 2020 with unified door arrangements of four doors per car.

A reserved seat limited stop liner service known as the TH Liner commenced service since 6 June 2020 and stop at selected stations along the Hibiya Line and the Tobu lines.

Station list
 All stations are located in Tokyo.

Rolling stock
Tokyo Metro 13000 series (7-car EMUs, since 25 March 2017)
 Tobu 70000 series (7-car EMUs, since 7 July 2017)
 Tobu 70090 series (7-car EMUs since 20 March 2020, for TH Liner)

Past
 TRTA 3000 series (from 1961 until July 1994)
 Tobu 2000 series (from 1962 until 1993)
 Tokyu 7000 series (original) (from 1964 until March 1991)
 Tokyu 1000 series (from 1991 until September 2013)
 Tokyo Metro 03 series (from 1988 until March 2020)
Tobu 20000 series (8-car EMUs, 1988 until February 2020)

History
The Hibiya Line was the fourth subway line built in Tokyo after the Ginza Line, Marunouchi Line, and Toei Asakusa Line.

Its basic plan was drawn up by a Ministry of Transportation committee in 1957. Called "Line 2" at the time, it was designed to connect Naka-Meguro in southwest Tokyo with Kita-Koshigaya in the northeast. The full northeastern extension of the line was never built, as the Tobu Railway upgraded to quadruple track within the same corridor to meet capacity demands.

Work began in 1959, with the first section opening in March 1961. The line opened in stages: the northern section, between Kita-Senju and Ningyōchō, was operational in May 1962; the southern section, between Naka-Meguro and Kasumigaseki, opened in March 1964.

The final segment, bridging Higashi-Ginza and Kasumigaseki, opened on 29 August 1964, just weeks before the opening ceremony for the 1964 Summer Olympics. Through service to the Tōkyū Tōyoko Line also began operations on this date. This was something of a coup for the Teito Rapid Transit Authority (the predecessor of today's Tokyo Metro), as the Toei Asakusa Line, which was also to be completed in time for the Olympics, had fallen behind schedule and remained under construction for the duration of the Games.

The Hibiya Line was one of the lines targeted in the 1995 Aum sarin gas attack.

On 8 March 2000, five people were killed and 63 were injured when a derailed Hibiya Line train was sideswiped by a second train near Naka-Meguro Station.

The line, station facilities, rolling stock, and other assets were inherited by Tokyo Metro after the privatization of the Teito Rapid Transit Authority (TRTA) in 2004.

16 March 2013 marked the end of through service with Tōkyū Tōyoko Line. All Hibiya Line trains now terminate Naka-Meguro Station.

Notes 

a. Crowding levels defined by the Ministry of Land, Infrastructure, Transport and Tourism:

100% — Commuters have enough personal space and are able to take a seat or stand while holding onto the straps or hand rails.
150% — Commuters have enough personal space to read a newspaper.
180% — Commuters must fold newspapers to read.
200% — Commuters are pressed against each other in each compartment but can still read small magazines.
250% — Commuters are pressed against each other, unable to move.

References

External links

 Official website (in English)

 
Lines of Tokyo Metro
Railway lines in Tokyo
Railway lines opened in 1961
1067 mm gauge railways in Japan
1500 V DC railway electrification